

Men's events

Women's events

Open events

Medal table

Events at the 1991 Pan American Games
Sailing at the Pan American Games
1991 in sailing
Sailing competitions in Cuba